{
  "type": "FeatureCollection",
  "features": [
    {
      "type": "Feature",
      "properties": {
          "title": "North pole of Prague",
          "description": "",
          "marker-symbol": "n",
          "marker-size": "large",
          "marker-color": "0050d0"},
      "geometry": {
        "type": "Point",
        "coordinates": [
          14.5268564,
          50.1774297
          
        ]
      }
    },
    {
      "type": "Feature",
      "properties": {
          "title": "South pole of Prague",
          "description": "",
          "marker-symbol": "s",
          "marker-size": "large",
          "marker-color": "0050d0"},
      "geometry": {
        "type": "Point",
        "coordinates": [
          14.3955631,
          49.9419
        ]
      }
    },
    {
      "type": "Feature",
      "properties": {
          "title": "East pole of Prague",
          "description": "",
          "marker-symbol": "e",
          "marker-size": "large",
          "marker-color": "0050d0"},
      "geometry": {
        "type": "Point",
        "coordinates": [
          14.7067875,
          50.0870189
        ]
      }
    },
    {
      "type": "Feature",
      "properties": {
          "title": "West pole of Prague",
          "description": "",
          "marker-symbol": "w",
          "marker-size": "large",
          "marker-color": "0050d0"},
      "geometry": {
        "type": "Point",
        "coordinates": [
          14.2244369,
          50.1029964
        ]
      }
    }
  ]
}The Prague Poles are the farthest points of the territory of Prague in all four cardinal directions. The poles are determined by the border between the capital city of Prague and the Central Bohemian Region. The poles were marked in November 2020 by Ondřej Boháč, director of Prague Institute of Planning and Development and Czech reporter Janek Rubeš. They are marked by 180kg concrete poles.

North pole of Prague 

 
The North pole of Prague lies on the border between the cadastral area of Třeboradice and Hovorčovice, on southeastern edge of the outskirts of Hovorčovice, in the Veleňská street near railway crossing. Place is publicly accessible. Concrete column marking the pole is not placed directly on the pole. Due to the railway protection zone it is placed on the other side of railway tracks.

South pole of Prague 

 
The South pole of Prague lies on the border of Zbraslav and Zvole, about 200 meters from the outskirts of Vrané nad Vltavou. The point is located in the floodplain on the right bank of the Vltava river between the A2 cycle path and the road connecting Vrané nad Vltavou and Jarov. Place is publicly accessible. Place is marked with a concrete column with a description.

East pole of Prague 

 
The East pole of Prague lies in the Klánovice Forest near Klánovice on the border of Újezd nad Lesy and Úvaly, about 500 meters west of the outskirts of Úvaly. Place is publicly accessible. Place is marked with a concrete column with a description. It lies about 50 meters away from the forest road with a green tourist sign, but in a dense thicket.

West pole of Prague 

 
The West pole of Prague lies on the border of Dobrovíz and Ruzyně, about 500 meters southeast of the outskirts of Dobrovíz (the Amazon complex), in the Security restricted area of Václav Havel Airport Prague, so it is inaccessible to the public. The concrete column with a description is therefore located at the end of the access road in front of the airport area, in a publicly accessible place about 100 meters from the geodetic west pole itself.

References 

Prague